Gyan Evans (born c. 1960), who performs as Gyan, is an Australian singer-songwriter and record producer. She began her musical career in the Sydney band Haiku before winning the 1986 grand final in the local version of the TV talent quest Star Search. This led to a recording contract with Warner Music, which resulted in her October 1989 debut self-titled album. It peaked in the top 30 on the ARIA Albums Chart and provided "Wait", which reached the top 20 on the ARIA Singles Chart. At the ARIA Music Awards of 1990 she won the ARIA Award for Best New Talent.

Early years
Gyan Evans was born in about 1960 and was raised in Geelong. Both her parents were English migrants and Gyan is the youngest of their four children. Her older sister Asakti Evans is also a singer. For secondary education Gyan attended Matthew Flinders Girls High School and, at the age of 17, changed her first name to Gyan: "I went to India ... I joined a weird religious cult and I was given that name by an old man with a long beard". By 1989 both her parents were dead.

Career

1989–1991: Debut album and ARIA Award
Gyan signed with the Trafalgar Productions label, which was distributed by Warner Australia. In October 1989 she released her debut self-titled album, which peaked at No. 27 on the ARIA Albums Chart. It was produced by Charles Fisher (1927, Midnight Oil, Hoodoo Gurus, Olivia Newton-John, Radio Birdman). Fisher had been given Gyan's demos by a mutual friend and together they recorded the album at Trafalgar Studios in Annandale. The Canberra Times Penelope Layland described the album as "patchy but reasonably successful ... [she] has an excellent voice. However, she also has what some of her contemporaries lack and that is a true sense of musical style and an already well-developed song-writing ability".

Ahead of the album in August she released a single, "Wait", which peaked at No. 14 on the ARIA Singles Chart and remained in the top 100 for 22 weeks. It was co-written by Gyan with Geoffrey Stapleton (GANGgajang) and Gary Frost of 1927. A second single, "It's Alright", was written by Gyan. It reached the top 50 in December. A third single, "Black Wedding Ring" was released in February 1990, and peaked at No. 93.

From October 1989 to January the next year, Gyan toured Australia to promote the album backed by The Dearly Beloved with Stapleton on guitar and keyboards, Asakti (Gyan's sister) on backing vocals, Hanuman Das on drums, Mark O'Connor on keyboards and David Sparks on guitar. Later Peter Willersdorf (ex-Tim Gaze Band) replaced Orszaczky on bass guitar. O'Connor had also worked on the album, co-writing tracks with Gyan. At the ARIA Music Awards of 1990 Gyan was awarded the Best New Talent for the previous year's work. In April that year she toured Europe, where she was popular in the Soviet Union despite her "fans not understanding the words of her songs".

1992–1997: Reddest Red
In 1992, Gyan released her second studio album, Reddest Red, which was again produced by Fisher. New Zealand musician, Dave Dobbyn, supplied guitar and backing vocals. In July 1992, the album's lead single, "Something's Gotta Give", which had been co-written with Gaze, was released, and entered the top 100 in August. A second single, "Visualize" was released in October. A track "Will I with You" from Reddest Red was used on the soundtrack for the Russell Crowe film The Sum of Us (July 1994). Some of her songwriting occurred when staying in "a pretty sleazy hotel – in London and it was good for writing because it was a kind of depressed place. It was interesting because it had this sort of contrast – a city falling down yet an energy with such large amounts of people".

Australian musicologist Ian McFarlane noted that Reddest Red "made less use of the synthesised textures of [her] debut". Jan Borrie of The Canberra Times said it was "more cohesive and well-rounded than the first and marks a more mature style of song writing for the singer". To promote the album Gyan toured with Tim Gaze on acoustic guitar (ex-Tamam Shud, Kahvas Jute, Rose Tattoo). Gyan was not worried by Gaze's previous bands "You can't go by what people have done before. I find that interesting chemistry often works." In 1995 Gyan relocated to London to work.

1998–2004: Suburban Opera
In 1998 Gyan travelled to the United States to start work on a third album titled Suburban Opera, with producer Desmond Child. It was not released in its entirety: a promo-only single, "Don't Hide Your Wild Away", was issued in 2001 and in 2003 most of its tracks first appeared as The Invisible Bird via Gyan's website. Meanwhile, she sang backing vocals on Ricky Martin's track "Nobody Wants to Be Lonely" from his album, Sound Loaded. She signed to Universal Records and worked as a songwriter for US country music singer, LeAnn Rimes. Rimes, who covered Gyan's song "Love Is an Army" on her album Twisted Angel, recalled:

2005–2009: Collaboration with Michael Leunig
By 2005 Gyan had returned to Australia and lived near Byron Bay. The following year she collaborated with Michael Leunig and released the album Billy the Rabbit which was based on Leunig's poetry. According to Gyan "It came about through a complete labour of love. I set a lot of his poetry to music over the space of a year without really knowing what I was doing. I had no motive, no plan. A friend of mine knew him and I contacted him at The Age and sent it to him, he fell madly in love with it." The album contained a duet with Paul Kelly on the track "The Path to Your Door". Released to glowing reviews, Gyan and Leunig launched the album at the Melbourne Writers Festival where Gyan sang and Leunig accompanied her whilst illustrating. The two artists also performed together at the Byron Bay Writers Festival and performed four shows at the Sydney Opera House in March 2007. The performance won the Sydney Theatre Award for Best Cabaret of 2007. The album of Billy the Rabbit was produced by Gyan and Simon Greaves.

2010–present: Superfragilistically and This Girl's in Love
Superfragilistically is Gyan's fifth studio album and was released in 2010. It was runner-up Best Adult-Themed Album of 2010 in The Sydney Morning Herald which previously gave the album a four-star review, calling it "intensely beautiful, emotionally honest, sensitive and seductive". The Brisbane Courier called it a "staggeringly beautiful record". It was Album of the Week on ABC Radio National's Daily Planet program, and featured on ABC Triple J's Sunday Night Safran program.

In 2015, Gyan released This Girl's in Love.

Other work
In 2002, Gyan contributed the song "Life's Great If You Don't Weaken" to the soundtrack of the Australian film The Nugget and co-wrote Paul Kelly's "Nobody She Knows". She also appears on the album Hymn for Her from James Cruickshank of The Cruel Sea.

In 2008, Gyan's children's book, How Weird Is That?, which features illustrations by Michelle Dawson was published. The book was shortlisted for the Crichton Award for Children's Book Illustration by the Children's Book Council of Australia. She also published a collection of poetry entitled Bear in Mind in 2012.

Gyan has also contributed to the soundtracks for the Australian films Weekend with Kate, The Sum of Us,  33 Postcards, Mental, Drift, The Turning, The Little Death and Little Tornadoes.

Discography

Albums

Singles

Awards

ARIA Music Awards
The ARIA Music Awards is an annual awards ceremony that recognises excellence, innovation, and achievement across all genres of Australian music. Gyan won one awards from four nominations.

|-
| rowspan="4"| 1990
| rowspan="3"| Gyan
| ARIA Award for Best Female Artist
| 
|-
| ARIA Award for Best New Talent
| 
|-
| ARIA Award for Breakthrough Artist – Album
| 
|-
| "Wait"
| ARIA Award for Breakthrough Artist – Single
| 

FILM

TELEVISION

References

External links
 

Australian women musicians
Australian women singer-songwriters
ARIA Award winners
Musicians from Geelong
Living people
Year of birth missing (living people)
21st-century Australian women musicians
21st-century Australian musicians
20th-century Australian women musicians
20th-century Australian musicians